Halieutichthys bispinosus belongs to the batfish family Ogcocephalidae. It is native to the Gulf of Mexico, and was discovered in 2010.

Description
According to Ho, Chakrabarty and Sparks: the fish "is characterized by having relatively strong tubercles on the dorsal surface, a row of tubercles almost always present dorsal to the orbit, both sphenotic tubercles well developed and sharp, trifid principal tubercles on the disk margin with anterior spinelet enlarged, dense arrangement of tubercles on the tail and a comparatively large adult body size."

References

Ogcocephalidae
Fish described in 2010
Taxa named by Prosanta Chakrabarty
Fish of the Gulf of Mexico